The Gerard Callenburgh class were a group of four destroyers ordered for the Royal Netherlands Navy just before World War II.

Design

These ships were larger than the preceding s. As those ships were outclassed by contemporary Japanese destroyers, the armament was increased to 5 guns with twin mounts in 'A' and 'Y' positions and a single gun in 'X' position. The torpedo outfit was also increased to two quadruple tubes. Isaac Sweers was completed in a British yard, with British armament and fire control equipment. She was fitted out with six 4-inch guns arranged in double turrets, four 40 mm Bofors and eight 0.5 in machine guns, as well as the customary eight torpedo tubes.

Service 
Only two ships were ever completed. Tjerk Hiddes was launched prior to the invasion, but was scuttled at Rotterdam to prevent her from falling into German hands. The Germans raised her, but found it impossible to repair her, so the wreckage was scrapped. Philips Van Almonde was demolished on the slipway after several attempts to launch her to be sailed to England had failed.

Gerard Callenburgh was also scuttled, but the Germans were able to salvage her. She was subsequently completed by Blohm & Voss, retaining most of the Dutch armament and equipment, and was commissioned as ZH1 on 11 October 1942. She spent most of her career on trials in the Baltic but was transferred to Western France via the English Channel in November 1943. ZH1 was torpedoed and badly damaged by Ashanti on 9 June 1944, and was scuttled with the loss of 33 men.

Isaac Sweers was, unlike her sister Philips Van Almonde, launched and then towed to England by the tug Zwarte Zee. She was completed in England by John I. Thornycroft & Company using British armament and fire control equipment. She then briefly served in the Indian Ocean with the Eastern Fleet.

Ships

Citations

General references 
 M. J. Whitley, Destroyers of World War 2, 1988 Cassell Publishing 
 Page on Callenburgh from Uboat.net
 Page on Isaac Sweers from Uboat.net
 Page on Isaac Sweers from the Dutch Navy
 Page from Dutch Destroyers 
 Technical page from the Dutch navy

 
Destroyer classes
World War II destroyers of the Netherlands